The United Nations Educational, Scientific and Cultural Organization (UNESCO) Biosphere Reserves are significant institutions of international status as described in the established order of the World Network of Biosphere Reserves within the framework of the Man and the Biosphere Programme. The biosphere reserves specifically promote and support sustainable development for conservation of biological and cultural diversity.

The Ohrid-Prespa Transboundary Biosphere Reserve shared with North Macedonia is the only biosphere reserve in Albania.

Biosphere Reserves 

The UNESCO Biosphere Reserves are environment-protected scientific-research institutions of international status recognised under the Man and the Biosphere (MAB) programme to promote sustainable development for conservation of biological and cultural diversity.

List of Biosphere Reserves

See also 
 World Heritage Sites in Albania
 Protected areas of Albania

References 

 
Nature conservation in Albania